Klazomenai or Clazomenae  was an ancient Greek city on the coast of Ionia and a member of the Ionian League. It was one of the first cities to issue silver coinage. Its ruins are now located in the modern town Urla near Izmir in Izmir Province, Turkey.

Location
Klazomenai is located in modern Urla (Vourla (Βουρλά) in Greek) on the western coast of Anatolia, on the southern coast of the Gulf of İzmir, at about 20 miles west of İzmir. The city was originally located on the mainland at Limantepe, but probably during the early fifth-century BC Ionian Revolt from the Persians, it was moved to the Karantina Island just off the coast. Soon after that, the city of Chyton was founded on the mainland the late fifth-century BC. Both cities had conflictual relations but Alexander the Great eventually connected Karantina island to the mainland with a causeway, the remains of which are still visible.

Mythology
A silver coin minted in Klazomenai shows the head of Apollo, the principal god of the city. According to myth, swans drew the chariot in which Apollo every year flew south from his winter home in the land of the Hyperboreans. But Klazomenai was also home to large numbers of swans, and it is thought that the verb klazo was used to describe the call of the wild birds. The swan on the obverse is both an attribute of Apollo and a pun on the name Klazomenai.

Ancient times
Though not in existence before the arrival of the Ionians in Asia, its original founders were largely settlers from Phlius and Cleonae. It stood originally near Limantepe; but the inhabitants, alarmed by the encroachments of the Persians, moved to the Karantina island of the bay, and established their city there.

Clazomenae was attacked by the Lydian king Alyattes in the 6th century. During the 5th century it was for some time subject to the Athenians, but about the middle of the Peloponnesian War (412 BC) it revolted. After a brief resistance, however, it again acknowledged the Athenian supremacy, and repelled a Lacedaemonian attack. In 387 BC Klazomenai and other cities in Asia were taken over by Persia, but the city continued to issue its own coins.

The philosopher Anaxagoras (c. 510 – 428 BC), often styled "Anaxagoras of Clazomenae", was born in Clazomenae, as was the earlier philosopher Hermotimus of Clazomenae.

Herodotos of Klazomenai was the first Clazomenian Olympic winner, his victory being in the boys foot-race. The Clazomenians dedicated a statue of him at Olympia, Greece.

Scopelian or Skopelianos of Clazomenae (Σκοπελιανός), was an ancient Greek sophist.

Under the Romans, Clazomenae was included in the province of Asia, and enjoyed an immunity from taxation.

Clazomenae early became a Christian bishopric. Its bishop, Eusebius took part in the Council of Ephesus in 431 and the Council of Chalcedon in 451. Another, Macarius, participated in the Council of Constantinople (869), which is seen within the Catholic Church as the eighth ecumenical council. Although still documented at the end of the 14th century, it is no longer a residential bishopric. Accordingly, Clazomenae is today listed by the Catholic Church as a titular see.

Archaeology

The site of Liman Tepe, which lies near an old harbour contains very important Bronze Age excavations, the most prominent and remarkable of which is the amount of varying archaic burial sites, as well as evidence of the practises associated with them close by. One possible explanation for this is that these sites were used by different social groups within society.

The city was famous for production and exports of olive oil and its painted terracotta Klazomenian sarcophagi, which are the finest monuments of Ionian painting in the 6th century BC.

A large painted terracotta sarcophagus and lid, together weighing about 2 tonnes, were discovered in the vicinity of Klazomenai in the late nineteenth century. An ancient Greek work dating to about 500 BC, the funerary objects depict war scenes, chariot racing, hunting as well as geometric patterns throughout and is now in the British Museum's collection.

It was also prized for its variety of garum.

Ancient olive press

Olive oil extraction installation (işlik) dating back to the third quarter of the 6th century BC uncovered in Klazomenai is the only surviving example of a level and weights press from an ancient Greek city and precedes by at least two centuries the next securely datable earliest presses found in Greece. It was restored and reconstructed in 2004–2005 through collaboration between Ege University, a Turkish olive-oil exporter and a German natural building components company, as well as by local artisans, on the basis of the clearly visible millstone with a cylindrical roller and three separation pits. The olive oil obtained turned out to be quite a success in business terms as well.

Financial pioneers
In an event noted by Aristotle, Klazomenians also appear as financial pioneers in economic history, for having used one commodity (olive oil), in an organized manner and on a city-scale, to purchase another (wheat), with interests refundable on the value of the first. Around 350 B.C., suffering from a shortage of grain and scarcity of funds, the rulers of the city passed a resolution calling on citizens who had stores of olive oil to lend to the city at interest. The loan arranged, they hired vessels and sent them to ports of exportation of grain and bought a consignment on the pledged security of the value of the oil.

See also
List of ancient Greek cities
Klazomenian vase painting 
Limantepe; the prehistoric site in Urla

References

Further reading
Greaves, A.M., 2010. The Land of Ionia: Society and Economy in the Archaic Period. Malden, MA: Wiley-Blackwell.
Cook, R.M., 1981. Clazomenian sarcophagi. Mainz: Zabern.
E. Koparal-E.İplikçi, “Archaic Olive Oil Extraction Plant in Klazomenai”, in A. Moustaka, E. Skarlatidou, M.C. Tzannes, Y. Ersoy (eds.), Klazomenai, Teos and Abdera: Metropoleis and Colony, Proceedings of the International Symposium held at the Archaeological Museum of Abdera (Oct. 2001), Thessaloniki 2004, 221-234.

External links

Excavations web site (in Turkish)

Geography of İzmir Province
Ancient Greek archaeological sites in Turkey
Ionian League
Former populated places in Turkey
History of İzmir Province
Members of the Delian League
Greek city-states
Populated places in ancient Ionia
Güzelbahçe District